Barinder Sran (born 10 December 1992) is an Indian international cricketer. He is a left-arm medium-fast bowler who plays for Chandigarh in domestic cricket and Mumbai Indians in the IPL. He was a member of the Rajasthan Royals squad in the 2015 Indian Premier League. He made his One Day International debut for India against Australia on 12 January 2016. He made his Twenty20 International (T20I) debut against Zimbabwe at Harare Sports Club on 20 June 2016 and took 4/10, which are the best bowling figures by an Indian debutant in T20I cricket. He is currently a net bowler for Gujarat Titans in IPL.

Domestic career 
After switching from boxing to cricket at the age of 17, Sran attended trials for Kings XI Punjab but was not selected. He received cricket training at an academy in Chandigarh, and then took part in the Gatorade Speedster, winning the North India leg. He won the Under-19 leg of Speedster, following which he was sent to Dubai to train at the ICC academy.

He made his debut for Punjab in 2011-12, taking part in T20s and Ranji Trophy. Injuries kept him out of action for a few seasons. In 2014, he attended trials conducted by Mumbai Indians and Rajasthan Royals and was bought by the latter at the 2015 IPL players auction. He played only one match for the Royals that year.

In a Ranji Trophy match in 2015, he took 6/61 and helped his team Punjab win by innings margin against Railways.

In January 2018, he was bought by the Kings XI Punjab in the 2018 IPL auction. In December 2018, he was bought by the Mumbai Indians in the player auction for the 2019 Indian Premier League. He was released by the Mumbai Indians ahead of the 2020 IPL auction.

International career 
Having played only eight List A matches, Sran was picked in the Indian ODI squad for the Australian tour in January 2016. He made his debut in the first ODI at Perth and took 3 for 56, dismissing Aaron Finch, David Warner and Steve Smith. He was then picked in the Indian ODI and T20 squad for the Indian cricket team's tour to Zimbabwe.

References

External links 
 

Living people
1992 births
Indian cricketers
India One Day International cricketers
India Twenty20 International cricketers
Cricketers from Haryana
People from Sirsa, Haryana
Punjab, India cricketers
Rajasthan Royals cricketers
Chandigarh cricketers